The 2017 Southeastern Louisiana Lions football team represented Southeastern Louisiana University in the 2017 NCAA Division I FCS football season. The Lions were led by sixth-year head coach Ron Roberts and played their home games at Strawberry Stadium. They were a member of the Southland Conference. They finished the season 6–5, 6–3 in Southland play to finish in fifth place.

On January 19, head coach Ron Roberts resigned to become the defensive coordinator at Louisiana. He finished at Southeastern Louisiana with a six-year record of 42–29.

Schedule

Source:

Game summaries

at Louisiana
Broadcasters: David Saltzman & Bobby Carpenter

Bethune-Cookman
Broadcasters: Lyn Rollins, Butch Alsandor, & Meghan Kluth

at No. 14 Central Arkansas
Broadcasters: Steve Sullivan & Fitz Hill

Lamar
Broadcasters: John Sartori, Wesley Boone, & Richie Solares

at Northwestern State
Broadcasters:

Incarnate Word
Broadcasters:

at Houston Baptist
Broadcasters:

at Abilene Christian
Broadcasters:

No. 5 Sam Houston State
Broadcasters:

at McNeese State
Broadcasters:

Nicholls State
Broadcasters:

References

Southeastern Louisiana
Southeastern Louisiana Lions football seasons
Southeastern Louisiana Lions football